Young Nation was a TV programme which aired on the BBC during the mid-1970s, shown as part of Nationwide. It often featured interviews with people of interest to the youth of the time. Its theme music, typical of the time, was a bouncy tune with high-pitched vocals by a female and a male (a clip of this was featured in the Sex Pistols documentary The Filth and the Fury). An excerpt from the program was seen on a bonus DVD that came with the 2006 re-issue of ABBA's Arrival album. According to a disclaimer at the start of the excerpt, the BBC no longer had the programme in their archives, and the clip was from the archive of ABBA's record label.

1970s British television series
BBC Television shows
Lost BBC episodes